Needle Peak is an 8,971-foot-elevation (2,734 meter) mountain summit in Placer County, California, United States.

Description
Needle Peak is located in the Granite Chief Wilderness on land managed by Tahoe National Forest. It is situated one mile west of the crest of the Sierra Nevada mountain range, with precipitation runoff from the peak draining north into headwaters of North Fork American River, and south into headwaters of Middle Fork American River. The Palisades Tahoe ski area is three miles east of Needle Peak. This landform's descriptive toponym has been officially adopted by the U.S. Board on Geographic Names, and has appeared in publications since at least 1899.

Climate
According to the Köppen climate classification system, Needle Peak is located in an alpine climate zone. Most weather fronts originate in the Pacific Ocean and travel east toward the Sierra Nevada mountains. As fronts approach, they are forced upward by the peaks (orographic lift), causing them to drop their moisture in the form of rain or snowfall onto the range.

See also

Gallery

References

External links
 Weather forecast: Needle Peak
 Needle Peak (photo): Peakbagger.com
 Needle Peak: Tahoeogul.org

North American 2000 m summits
Mountains of Northern California
Tahoe National Forest
Mountains of the Sierra Nevada (United States)
Mountains of Placer County, California